The Beijing–Lanzhou corridor is a high-speed rail corridor running from Beijing through Hohhot and Yinchuan to Lanzhou. It was announced in 2016 as part of the "eight verticals and eight horizontals" railway network plan.

Sections

References

See also 
 High-speed rail in China

High-speed rail in China